According to the World Trade Organization's statistics, Pakistan's exports of wooden furniture amounted to $51 million in 2011. The furniture industry in Pakistan has been expanding. Many new furniture companies are now joining the furniture industry. 

Our handmade furniture is in high demand by high-end customers. Pakistani furniture manufacturers have expertise in this area, due to the type of wood used namely 'sheesham' (rosewood) which adds to this furniture's demand. The leading wood-furniture-making areas of Pakistan are Chiniot, Gujrat, Peshawar, Lahore and Karachi.

Impact of increased consumer spending
Consumer spending increased by an average of 26% - per the Bloomberg's report, which was published on November 21, 2013. It's not only that the Fast-moving consumer goods (FMCGs) companies get benefits from increased consumer spending; the furniture manufacturers also benefit from it.

Pakistan's furniture exports
As per World Trade Organization's statistics, the wooden furniture exports of Pakistan reportedly amounted to almost $51 million in the calendar year (CY) 2011. Whereas, in 2009-2010 the furniture exports of Pakistan ranged between $25 million to $30 million (excluding undocumented exports of an approximate amount of $10 million). However, according to the All Pakistan Furniture Exporters Association (APFEA)] founder, Turhan Baig Muhammad, these exports represent a very small portion of the total furniture business of the country. According to him, the local furniture market is almost 50 times stronger than that of the exports. Keeping this in view, the approximate total furniture sale of the country is more than $2.5 billion.

Fears for the furniture industry of Pakistan
Total world trade of furniture is estimated to be $23.2 billion. Wood furniture accounts for 77 percent, metal furniture 17 percent, and plastic furniture 6 percent of the total. In 2010, the share of Pakistan in the international furniture market is trivial. Even though the country takes pride in having a history of craftsmanship, it does not share a significant position in the international wood furniture market.

Domestic furniture industry is suffering because furniture exports to Pakistan from some other countries have increased, whereas, the high cost of furniture-making business is increasing problems for the local furniture manufacturers. The prices of raw materials which includes timber, colour paints, chipboard, polish materials, and foams have increased manifold. Due to unchecked deforestation, timber production of the country is also suffering.
 
Wood furniture industry of Pakistan is categorized as being small because old obsolete machinery is used in this industry, which is the reason for higher cost and low output. Traditional wood furniture in Pakistan is heavy and bulky. Pakistani furniture industry needs to go to light-weight and moveable furniture to be exported to the world market where demand is high to meet the needs of offices, shopping malls, buildings and shopping plazas.

Pakistan furniture council urges the government to bar furniture imports. Mostly, office furniture, bar stools, visitor chairs are imported from other countries and there is a huge demand for these products in Pakistan.

Furniture City in Faisalabad
The Faisalabad Industrial Estate Development and Management Company (FIEDMC) has plans, in 2014, to set up a furniture city in the industrial area of Faisalabad, Pakistan. According to a news source, wood seasoning plants will be established to manufacture international standard furniture.

In this regard, FIEDMC has joined hands with the European-based IKEA company, the world's largest furniture retailer that designs and sells ready-to-assemble furniture, for the development of the furniture city in Faisalabad. The same report tells that by this initiative about 200,000 job opportunities will be created.

Role of IT in the furniture industry of Pakistan
Local furniture manufacturers are using internet to market their products. They also have started to use social media channels to market their business activities.

Improvements in furniture industry
"Pakistan needs to bring improvements to its furniture industry to increase the total revenue generated from this industry", said the Pakistani Federal Minister for Commerce, Khurram Dastagir. The country does not lack resources and skills when it comes to manufacturing quality furniture. However, there is a need to exploit these resources in order to expand the furniture industry of Pakistan and increase international trade and foreign exchange income from it. The market beyond Pakistani borders is substantially larger than the local market.

References

External links
 All Pakistan Furniture Exporters Association website 

Furniture-making
Pakistani business culture